Sheffield plate is a layered combination of silver and copper that was used for many years to produce a wide range of household articles.  Almost every article made in sterling silver was also crafted by Sheffield makers, who used this manufacturing process to produce nearly identical wares at far less cost.

History
The material was accidentally invented by Thomas Boulsover, of Sheffield's Cutlers Company, in 1743.  While trying to repair the handle of a customer's decorative knife, he heated it too much and the silver started to melt.  When he examined the damaged handle, he noticed that the silver and copper had fused together very strongly. Experiments showed that the two metals behaved as one when he tried to reshape them, even though he could clearly see the two different layers.

Boulsover set up in business, funded by Strelley Pegge of Beauchief, and carried out further experiments in which he put a thin sheet of silver on a thick ingot of copper and heated the two together to fuse them.  When the composite block was hammered or rolled to make it thinner, the two metals were reduced in thickness at similar rates.  Using this method, Boulsover was able to make sheets of metal which had a thin layer of silver on the top surface and a thick layer of copper underneath.  When this new material was used to make buttons, they looked and behaved like silver buttons but were a fraction of the cost.

The process and material are sometimes compared to the Japanese mokume-gane.

Double sandwich form
The "double sandwich" form of Sheffield plate was developed around 1770.  Used for pieces such as bowls and mugs that had a visible interior, it consisted of a sheet of silver each side of a piece of copper; early manufacturers applied a film of solder over the bare edge of copper although such pieces are very rare.  Edges of early salvers were hidden by folding them over but from about 1790, borders were applied with U-shaped lengths of silver wire to conceal the copper which can often be felt as a lip on the underside. Towards the end of the period, solid wire was sometimes used which can be hard to see.

Nickel silver
Following the invention of German silver (60% copper, 20% nickel and 20% zinc), around 1820, it was found that this new material also fused well with sheet silver and provided a suitable base metal for the Sheffield process. Because of its nearly silver colour, German silver also revealed less wear, or "bleeding", when Sheffield-made articles were subject to daily use and polishing. Being much harder than copper, it was used from the mid-1830s but only for articles such as trays or cylindrical items that did not require complex shaping.

Later practice
After about 1840 the Sheffield plate process was generally replaced with electroplating processes, such as that of George Elkington. Electroplating tends to produce a "brilliant" surface with a hard colour – as it consists of pure rather than sterling silver and is usually deposited more thinly. Sheffield plate continued to be used for up to a further 100 years for silver-plated articles subject to heavy wear, most commonly uniform buttons and tankards. During the 1840–50 period hybrid articles such as sugar bowls were produced, with the body being Old Sheffield and complicated small parts such as the feet and handles made from electroplate. These are rare and seldom recognised.

The Sheffield plating process is not often used today.

During the Second World War, a process analogous to Sheffield plating was used to build intercoolers for Rolls-Royce Merlin engines to overcome problems with thermal fracturing.

Usage
Items produced in Sheffield plate included buttons, caddy spoons, fish slices, serving utensils, candlesticks and other lighting devices, coffee and tea sets, serving dishes and trays, tankards and pitchers, and larger items such as soup tureens and hot-water urns.

Replating and recognition
Much Old Sheffield seen today has been re-plated, especially items which received much use and polishing, such as candlesticks. Items seldom displayed or used, such as egg cruets or soufflé dishes, are often in excellent condition and so may be confused with electroplate. Collectors should be aware that many designs have been reproduced in electroplate, with those from the early 1900s being the hardest to recognise since, like the original items, they seldom have a maker's mark. The way to recognise the genuine article is to look for signs that it was soldered from pre-plated metal sheet or wire rather than constructed in base metal and plated afterwards. Look carefully for soldered joints, often well-disguised by the experts of the time.

Terminology
The term "Sheffield Plate" is widely used these days by those dealing in electroplate produced in Sheffield, and most collectors prefer to use the term "Old Sheffield Plate" to identify the early fused plate product described on this page. Another misuse of the term is in describing "Close Plated" ware, which was generally made in Birmingham in the first half of the 19th century. Close plate consists of silver foil soldered onto a steel base and was used for items such as candle snuffers or cutlery requiring greater strength than fused plate.

See also
German silver
Mokume-gane
Electroplating
Plated ware
Plating

References

Silversmithing
English inventions
History of Sheffield
Copper objects